G. Basavankoppa is a village in Dharwad district of Karnataka, India.

Demographics 
As of the 2011 Census of India there were 292 households in G. Basavankoppa and a total population of 1,660 consisting of 853 males and 807 females. There were 234 children ages 0-6.

References

Villages in Dharwad district